The Fuzhou–Yinchuan Expressway, designated as G70 and commonly referred to as the Fuyin Expressway is an expressway that connects the cities of Fuzhou, Fujian, China, and Yinchuan, Ningxia.

The expressway was completed with the opening of the Jiujiang Yangtze River Expressway Bridge. Previously, expressway traffic was rerouted over the Jiujiang Bridge that also carried local traffic on China National Highway 105.

In Ningxia, it is an important north-south route between Yinchuan and Guyuan.

References

Chinese national-level expressways
Expressways in Fujian
Expressways in Jiangxi
Expressways in Hubei
Expressways in Shaanxi
Expressways in Gansu
Expressways in Ningxia